Sigo Invicto ("Still Undefeated") is the tenth studio album by Colombian singer Silvestre Dangond and the first as soloist, released on November 26, 2014 by Sony Music Colombia. His cousin Jorge Dangond is the principal accordionist of the album.

Track listing

Charts

References 

2014 albums
Silvestre Dangond albums
Spanish-language albums
Sony Music Colombia albums
Sony Music Latin albums